Sunil Dev (born 30 May 1948) is an Indian former cricketer. He played one first-class match for Delhi in 1969/70.

See also
 List of Delhi cricketers

References

External links
 

1948 births
Living people
Indian cricketers
Delhi cricketers
Cricketers from Delhi